Goodenia pinifolia, commonly known as pine-leaved goodenia, is a species of flowering plant in the family Goodeniaceae and is endemic to the southwest of Western Australia. It is an erect or spreading shrub with linear or tapering leaves on the stems, loose racemes of white or pale blue flowers, and more or less spherical fruit.

Description
Flowering mainly occurs from October to December and the fruit is a more or less spherical capsule  in diameter.

Taxonomy and naming
Goodenia pinifolia was first formally described in 1854 by Willem Hendrik de Vriese in the journal Natuurkundige Verhandelingen van de Hollandsche Maatschappij der Wetenschappen te Haarlem. The specific epithet (pinifolia) means "pine-leaved".

Distribution and habitat
Pine-leaved goodenia grows on sandplains between Perenjori and Ravensthorpe in the south-west of Western Australia.

Conservation status
This goodenia is classified as "not threatened" by the Department of Environment and Conservation (Western Australia).

References

pinifolia
Endemic flora of Western Australia
Plants described in 1854
Taxa named by Willem Hendrik de Vriese